A Gansito (literally "little goose", from the Spanish diminutive of ganso, "goose") is a Mexican snack cake, described as “a strawberry-flavored jelly and crème-filled cake with chocolate-flavored coating.”  It is made and distributed by the Marinela Brand, which is owned by Grupo Bimbo. Gansito Snack Cakes are also available in the U.S., Colombia, Peru, and many countries in Latin America, as well as having a limited presence in Europe. In 2019 in the U.S., 5.46 million Americans ate Gansito Snack Cakes 1-3 times a month, 1.24 million ate 4-7 in a month, and 1.31 ate 8 or more in a month.

History 

The Gansito Snack Cake was invented in Mexico City, Mexico in 1957 at the Marinela factory. Alfonso Velasco invented the original recipe for the snack cake, while Victor Milke, Guadalupe Pérez, and Roberto Servitje designed the molds necessary to produce the snack cake.  At first, the molds only made two Gansito Snack Cakes at a time; today’s can create 18 at the same time.  It was one of the first three, individually wrapped snack cakes produced at the Marinela factory, and the first order made at the factory was for 500 Gansito Snack Cakes, which took eight hours to create.  The Gansito Snack Cake took precedence in the Marinela Brand, and Lorenzo Servitje and Jaime Jorba, two of the original founders of Grupo Bimbo and Marinela, called Gansito Snack Cakes the star of Marinela products.  

Gansito Snack Cakes became Marinela’s product leader, representing 65% of all product sales. At first, it only cost consumers 80 cents, and by 1975 Marinela was selling 1 million Gansito Snack Cakes a day.

The snack cake soon became a beloved product and an all-time favorite in Mexico as Grupo Bimbo expanded through the country and created routes to even the most distant villages.  The popular Gansito Character that became a trademark of Marinela and decorates the snack cakes’ packaging was designed by Alfonso Velasco, who was one of Bimbo’s founders. Velasco also created the famous tagline, “¡Recuérdame!” which means, “Remember me!” Gansito Snack Cakes are one-of-a-kind and different from other snack cakes in that they are coated in chocolate-flavored icing and sprinkles and filled with crème and jelly filling. The dessert was first delivered by bicycles and then by unique, three-wheeled motor vans in Mexico called “ganseras.” The salesmen who rode these vehicles to deliver goods were nicknamed “ganseros”.   The routes the ganseros sold Gansito Snack Cakes along were called “rutas ganseras.”

References

External links
Marinelausa.com

Brand name snack foods